Ocean Dream may refer to:

 , a former cruise ship, launched in 1972 and originally known as the Spirit of London
 , currently an Australian cruise ship, launched in 1982
 Ocean Dream Diamond, 5.51ct blue-green diamond
 One Piece: Ocean's Dream, a One Piece video game